The Tyria is a river in the western part of the Ioannina regional unit in Epirus, Greece. It is a left tributary of the Thyamis. The source of the river Tyria is near the village Platania, on the western slope of the Tomaros mountain. It flows into a generally northwestern direction. It flows into the Thyamis, near Vrosina.

The Tyria flows along the following villages, from source to mouth: Koumaria, Seniko, Chinka, Granitsa and Polydoro.

References

Rivers of Greece
Landforms of Ioannina (regional unit)
Rivers of Epirus (region)
1Tyria